Out of the Dark (Spanish: Aguas rojas) is a 2014 English-language supernatural thriller film starring Julia Stiles, Scott Speedman, and Stephen Rea. The independent Spanish-Colombian co-production is directed by Lluís Quílez based on a screenplay by Alex Pastor, David Pastor, and Javier Gullón. Filming took place in Colombia between April 2013 and July 2013, after which it entered post-production.

Plot
In 1992,  Dr. Andres Contreras Sr. prepares to abandon a finca in Santa Clara, Colombia. He attempts to burn a number of files, stashing them in the dumbwaiter when he hears noises around the house. On the second floor, he is chased by what appears to be a group of children, falling to his death when he is pushed from the balcony.

Twenty years later, Sarah and Paul Harriman move from the UK to Santa Clara with their daughter, Hannah. Sarah is to be the new manager at a paper mill that her father, Jordan, owns. They move into the finca, which is owned by the company. The small family adore the finca, though Hannah is frightened by the open dumbwaiter in the wall of her room.

Shortly after their arrival, Sarah and Paul attend a dinner on the opening night of the Los Niños Santos festival, leaving Hannah in the care of her nanny, Catalina. Strange occurrences begin to occur around the finca, and a sleeping Hannah is woken by the door of the dumbwaiter snapping open. Seeing her favorite stuffed toy, Hannah climbs into the dumbwaiter to retrieve it, becoming trapped.

Arriving home, Sarah and Paul discover Hannah, ill and developing a rash. Catalina uncomfortably mentions that she believes there was a ghost in the house and is fired by Paul. Over the following day, Hannah ails, her rash worsening, and the couple agree to take Hannah back to the UK for proper medical care.

That night, as a storm brews, children who wear stained and dirty bandages appear and kidnap Hannah, taking her away through the jungle. The police are skeptical of Sarah and Paul's account, and a frustrated Paul searches for Catalina, desperate for answers.

Catalina takes Paul to the church where he sees one of the children, following the boy back to a shanty house where he finds the parents of a boy who vanished mysteriously 20 years ago. Prior to his disappearance, the child exhibited the same symptoms as Hannah. Meanwhile, Sarah notices a drawing Hannah made of the dumbwaiter and investigates. Falling to the bottom of the shaft, she discovers the files of several children who died of mercury poisoning.

Separately, Sarah and Paul make their way to the old paper mill where they meet and search for Hannah. Jordan aids in their search, crawling through a pipe to be confronted by the children, who begin to remove the bandages covering their burn-like rashes. He is attacked by the children because of his hiding the dead bodies instead of telling the police and the children's families about their deaths. He then sees Hannah and makes his way to her.

Cradling his granddaughter, trickles of mercury emerge from her rashes and are absorbed by Jordan's body. Surrounded by the children, the mercury streaming from their bodies, he dies. Hannah awakens, now healthy, in her mother's arms.

Over the credits, children play in a school named for the shanty town the missing children had lived in. Hannah is a student, and Catalina is now a teacher.

Cast
 Julia Stiles as Sarah Harriman
 Scott Speedman as Paul Harriman
 Stephen Rea as Jordan
 Pixie Davies as Hannah Harriman
 Alejandro Furth as Dr. Andres Contreras Jr.
 Guillermo Morales Vitola

Production

Out of the Dark is directed by Lluís Quílez based on a screenplay by Alex Pastor, David Pastor, and Javier Gullón. The film is a Spanish-Colombian co-production. Out of the Dark is Colombia-based Dynamo's first English-language production. Participant Media fully financed the production, which has a budget of under  after subsidies and tax breaks from the production companies' countries. Filming began in Bogota, Colombia in late April 2013. By July 2013, the film entered post-production.

Release

In November 2013, Exclusive Media acquired international rights to sell Out of the Dark. Vertical Entertainment released the film in a limited theatrical screening on February 27, 2015 the United States.

Reception
Rotten Tomatoes, a review aggregator, reports that 24% of 21 surveyed critics gave the film a positive review; the average rating is 4.5/10.  Metacritic rated it 33/100 based on nine reviews.  Dennis Harvey of Variety said that it "offers professional polish but no interesting ideas or atmospherics".  Frank Scheck of The Hollywood Reporter wrote, "The by-then-numbers thriller features the usual genre tropes, with a particular emphasis on placing its youngest main character in constant jeopardy."  Jeannette Catsoulis of The New York Times called it "derivative and devoid of tension".  Robert Abele of the Los Angeles Times wrote that it is "a movie lovely to look at but on-the-nose and crushingly dull".  Chris Packham of The Village Voice wrote, "Stylishly filmed and often scary, Out of the Dark unspools a conclusion as conventional and button-down as a wide tie knot and a pair of wingtips."  Michael Gingold of Fangoria rated it 2/4 stars and wrote that the film "is content to go through its good-looking motions without offering the audience much that’s fresh".  Patrick Cooper of Bloody Disgusting rated it 2/5 stars and wrote that it has "remarkable photography and palpable atmosphere" but is too predictable.  Matt Boiselle of Dread Central rated it 1.5/5 stars and called it a boring film with a lackluster conclusion.

See also
 List of Spanish films of 2014
 List of films depicting Colombia

Notes

References

External links
 

2014 films
2014 horror films
2010s ghost films
2014 horror thriller films
Colombian horror films
Films about families
Films set in 1992
Films set in Colombia
Films shot in Colombia
Haunted house films
Spanish horror films
Spanish thriller films
2010s supernatural thriller films
Participant (company) films
Vertical Entertainment films
2010s English-language films
2010s Spanish films